Juan Ignacio Chela and Gastón Gaudio were the defending champions.  Chela participated with Tommy Robredo this year, finishing runner-up.  Gaudio did not participate this year.

František Čermák and Leoš Friedl won in the final 6–3, 6–4, against Juan Ignacio Chela and Tommy Robredo.

Seeds

Draw

Draw

External links
 Draw

2005 Estoril Open